Evan Thapa (born Darshan Yoyal Thapa; 30 December 2003) is an Indian professional footballer who plays as a defender for I-League club Indian Arrows.

Career
Born in Sikkim, Evan Thapa started his football career with Sikkim Boys Club and later joined AIFF Elite Academy.

Indian Arrows
On 19 November 2020, It was announced that Evan Thapa was selected for All India Football Federation's developmental side Indian Arrows. He made his debut for club in I-League against NEROCA FC on 20 January 2021.

Career statistics

References

2003 births
Living people
People from Sikkim
Indian footballers
Footballers from Sikkim
Association football defenders
I-League players
Indian Arrows players
India youth international footballers